Anton Levtchi (born 28 November 1995) is a Finnish professional ice hockey forward currently playing with Tappara in the Liiga.

Playing career
Levtchi made his professional debut playing with his original club, Tappara of Liiga during the 2016–17 season.

In his sixth year in the Liiga with Tappara, Levtchi had a break-out 2021–22 season offensively, leading the Liiga in scoring in finishing tied first in goals with 26 and second in assists with 35 for 61 points through 55 regular season games. He helped lead Tappara to claim the Finnish Championship in claiming the Kanada-malja trophy. He was selected to the Liiga All-Star Team and finished with the Liiga Golden Helmet.

As an undrafted free agent, Levtchi agreed to pursue a career in North America, signing a one-year, entry-level contract with the Florida Panthers on 15 June 2022. By signing with the Panthers, Levtchi was reunited in joining former junior teammate and captain of the Panthers in Aleksander Barkov. After attending the Panthers training camp in preparation for the  season, Levtchi was re-assigned to begin his transition to North America to American Hockey League (AHL) affiliate the Charlotte Checkers on 2 October 2022.

Levtchi registered 13 points through 24 games with the Checkers before he received his first recall to the NHL by the Panthers on 28 December 2022. He made his NHL debut on 29 December 2022, featuring in a depth forward role in a 7-2 victory over the Montreal Canadiens. Following his second appearance with the Panthers, Levtchi was returned to the AHL on 1 January 2023. Levtchi appeared in a further 11 games with the Checkers, before opting to be placed on unconditional waivers by the Panthers in order to mutually terminate his contract on 31 January 2023. 

On 1 February 2023, Levtchi returned to his native Finland, re-joining Tappara of the Liiga for the remainder of the season.

Career statistics

Awards and honours

References

External links
 

1995 births
Living people
Charlotte Checkers (2010–) players
Finnish ice hockey forwards
Florida Panthers players
Lempäälän Kisa players
People from Varkaus
Sportspeople from North Savo
Tappara players
Undrafted National Hockey League players